The European wild ass (Equus hemionus hydruntinus) or hydruntine is an extinct equine from the Middle Pleistocene to Late Holocene of Western Eurasia. It appeared first in the fossil record around 350–300,000 years before present. In the late Pleistocene it was widespread throughout much of western Eurasia from the Middle East to Europe, especially along the Mediterranean, with fossil reports from Sicily, Turkey, Spain, France and Portugal. In the east the range apparently stretched at least to the Volga and to Iran. In the north it reached almost to the North Sea in Germany and the British Isles. Its range fragmented after the Last Glacial Maximum, surviving into the Holocene, its range gradually contracted further, persisting in small regions of southern Europe into the Bronze Age, and in Iran and the Caucasus into the Iron Age, around 500 BC.  It has been suggested that the Iberian Zebro, extinct in the wild from the 16th century, could correspond to the Equus hydruntinus, although the word "zebro" or "cebro" comes from Latin equiferus meaning 'wild horse'. Later research judged that it was unlikely that hydruntines persisted in the Iberian Peninsula beyond the Chalcolithic.

Morphologically the European ass can be distinguished from asses and hemiones particularly by its molars and the relatively short nares. The exact systematic position was formerly unclear but genetic and morphological analysis suggested that it is closely related to the Asiatic wild ass. A 2017 genetic study found that it was a subspecies of Asiatic wild ass, closer to the Khur than the Persian onager.

Etymology
The specific epithet, hydruntinus, means from Otranto (Hydruntum in Latin).

Ecology 
The evidence shows that the European ass favoured semi-arid, steppic conditions and showed a preference for temperate climates, although it was also found in cool or cold conditions. It may have retreated to warmer locales during the coldest periods although the relatively short muzzle indicates an adaptation for cold conditions. It preferred open biotopes, between shrubland (favoured by true horses) and grassland (favoured by bovids). It is believed to have shared this habitat with species such as the woolly rhinoceros. It is considered an ecologically important part of the ecosystem known as mammoth steppe where it filled a niche equivalent to that provided by the African wild ass or Zebra in the African Savanna.

See also
List of extinct animals of Europe

References

Onager
Pleistocene mammals of Europe
Extinct mammals of Europe
Holocene extinctions
Middle Pleistocene
Late Pleistocene
Extinct mammals
Mammals described in 1907